The 1959 Baylor Bears football team represented Baylor University in the 1959 NCAA University Division football season. The team finished with a record of 4–6.

Schedule

References

Baylor
Baylor Bears football seasons
Baylor Bears football